The Dwarka Mor Metro Station is located on the Blue Line of the Delhi Metro. It is the nearest metro station to Netaji Subhas University of Technology and Deen Dayal Upadhyaya College.

The station

Station layout

Facilities
List of available ATM at Dwarka Mor metro station are Ratnakar Bank, Federal Bank.

Entry/Exit

Connections
It is approximately twenty five kilometers from the New Delhi Railway Station and thirteen kilometers from the Indira Gandhi International Airport. Dwarka Mor metro station is connected by the Delhi Metro to Connaught Place, making it easy for commuters to reach.

Bus
Delhi Transport Corporation bus routes number 724EXT, 816A, 816EXT, 817, 817A, 817B, 818, 819, 822, 824, 824SSTL, 824STL, 825, 826, 827, 828, 829, 832LinkSTL, 833, 834, 835, 836, 845, 872, 873, 876, 878, 883A, 887, 891STL serves the station from outside metro station stop.

Gallery

See also

Delhi
List of Delhi Metro stations
Transport in Delhi
Delhi Metro Rail Corporation
Delhi Suburban Railway
Delhi Monorail
Delhi Transport Corporation
West Delhi
New Delhi
Dwarka, Delhi
National Capital Region (India)
List of rapid transit systems
List of metro systems

References

External links

 Delhi Metro Rail Corporation Ltd. (Official site) 
 Delhi Metro Annual Reports
 
 UrbanRail.Net – Descriptions of all metro systems in the world, each with a schematic map showing all stations.

Delhi Metro stations
Railway stations opened in 2005
Railway stations in West Delhi district